University of Applied Sciences Jena (UAS Jena) (German: Ernst-Abbe-Hochschule Jena (EAH Jena)) was founded on 1 October 1991 as one of the first institutions of higher education of its kind in the newly founded federal states of Germany. Since the beginning of summer semester 2012, it bears the name of the entrepreneur Ernst Abbe. The university is characterized above all by its high practical orientation and research strength. Their slogan is: Innovation for quality of life. Health, precision, sustainability & networking!

History 
During the trial operation in the winter semester 1991, 272 students joined, and nowadays about 4,400 students are enrolled at the UAS Jena. After extensive renovation and redesign, at the end of 2001, all departments, the university administration as well as the central library with the patent and research site moved to the campus in the Carl-Zeiss-Promenade in Jena.

In the summer semester 2012, the Fachhochschule Jena was renamed to Ernst-Abbe-Fachhochschule Jena. Due to changes in the Higher Education Act in October 2014, an additional change of name followed. The new name Ernst-Abbe-Hochschule Jena intended to clarify the competences of the university in the areas of teaching and research. The use of the name Ernst Abbe, a researcher, entrepreneur and social reformer, represents the UAS Jena fields of specialisation in a perfect way.

Structure and Courses 
The University of Applied Sciences Jena offers about 50 Bachelor's and Master's degree programs in the fields of technology, business, social affairs and health. They are all characterized by a very high practical relevance. The university ensures this in particular through its integration into various networks, the appointment of professors from industry as well as through project and research work, internships, excursions and theses with numerous cooperation partners. In addition, simulation games, case studies and practical lectures are integrated into the curriculum, interdisciplinary events are offered and coaching-based support services,such as those of the Career Service and the Start-up Service, are made available. The Bachelor's and Master's degree programs at UAS Jena meet high scientific standards and at the same time meet the practical requirements for specialists and managers of tomorrow.

The degree programmes are assigned to the following nine departments:
 Business Administration
 Electrical Engineering and Information Technology
 Fundamental Sciences
 Mechanical Engineering
 Medical Engineering and Biotechnology
 Health and Nursing
 SciTec (Science and Technology)
 Social Work
 Industrial Engineering

Research, development and transfer 
The research and development of UAS Jena includes four research priorities:
 Precision Systems
 Technologies and Materials
 Health and Sustainability
 Digitalisation 

The interaction of a wide variety of disciplines enables a creative and innovative approach to research topics and problems. The university understands cooperation with business and society as a multidirectional interaction. That is why we support researchers and teachers as well as external partners in transfer activities. In addition, we promote the transfer of knowledge through internships, theses and doctoral projects as well as through active support and accompaniment in business start-up projects.

University of Applied Sciences International 
The UAS Jena cooperates with numerous universities and research institutions worldwide. It thus promotes the exchange of students, scientists as well as ideas and know-how. The proportion of exchange students is rising continuously. Lecturers at UAS Jena also work temporarily at universities in Europe, Asia, Africa and America. This development is specifically promoted by numerous cooperation agreements. One focus of internationalisation is cooperation within the framework of the ERASMUS+ programme of the European Union. The proportion of international students is around 22%. Studying and internship abroad are integrated into the curriculum in some degree programs.

Graduation and Doctoral degrees 
Interested students have the opportunity of a cooperative doctoral project at the EAH Jena. For this purpose, there are contractual agreements with various universities.

Campus of University of Applied Sciences Jena 
The campus of UAS Jena is located in the premises of Carl Zeiss AG. Located southwest of the city center of Jena, the university can be reached quickly. After refurbishment of the last building in October 2008 the campus with a size of 26,000 m2 has seven lecture halls, 124 laboratories and a total of 1,500 rooms. On the grounds of UAS Jena, the Studierendenwerk Thüringen operates  a canteen, a cafeteria, a café-bar and a dormitory. The library of the UAS Jena includes approximately 300,000 books, videos and CDs. Since June 1999, the UAS Jena has its own climatological station. The local climate is recorded and can be accessed on the Internet.

References

External links 
 Website of University of Applied Sciences Jena

Public universities and colleges in Germany
Universities and colleges in Thuringia
Vocational education in Germany
Education in Jena
Universities of Applied Sciences in Germany